The radial collateral artery (another term for the anterior descending branch of the profunda brachii artery) is a branch of the deep brachial artery.  It arises in the arm proper and anastomoses with the radial recurrent artery near the elbow.

See also
 superior ulnar collateral artery
 inferior ulnar collateral artery
 medial collateral artery

Additional images

External links

Arteries of the upper limb